Pennsylvania Route 362  (designated by the Pennsylvania Department of Transportation as PA 362)  is a  state highway located in Tioga County, Pennsylvania.  The western terminus is at U.S. Route 6 in Shippen Township.  The eastern terminus is at Route 660 near Wellsboro in Delmar Township.

Route description

PA 362 begins at an intersection with US 6 in the community of Ansonia in Shippen Township, heading south on two-lane undivided Pinecreek Road. The route heads through forested areas of mountains, running to the east of Pine Creek. The road curves southeast away from Pine Creek and turns to the east. PA 362 continues into agricultural areas with some homes, passing to the north of Wellsboro Johnston Airport. The route enters Delmar Township and runs through more farmland before reaching its eastern terminus at PA 660.

History
Route 362 was first assigned in September 1941. The route has retained the same alignment since its creation.

Major intersections

See also

References

External links

Pennsylvania Highways: PA 362

362
Transportation in Tioga County, Pennsylvania